Breaking State is the second studio album by Brix & the Extricated, released on 26 October 2018 on Grit Over Glamour Records.

The album was made available on  blue vinyl, CD and download.

Critical reception

It was released to critical acclaim, Jane Phenton of Her Edit praised its 'distinct sense of a song-writing heritage with undertones of Blondie, the Beach Boys and David Bowie'." It was also favourably reviewed by Uncut and Q.

Track listing
All songs written by Brix & the Extricated / Brix Smith
"Alaska" 
"H.C."
"Dog Face (Lost in Gdansk)"
"Prime Numbers"
"American Skies"
"Vanity"
"Sleazebag"
"Going Strong"
"Heavy Crown"
"Unrecognisable"

Personnel
Brix & the Extricated
Brix Smith Start - vocals
Steve Hanley - bass guitar
Paul Hanley - drums
Steve Trafford - guitar, vocals
Jason Brown - guitar, harmonica

References

2018 albums
Brix & the Extricated albums